Miltonvale is a city in Cloud County, Kansas, United States.  As of the 2020 census, the population of the city was 440.

History

Miltonvale was founded on December 1, 1881. The town had its start by the building of a narrow gauge railway through the neighborhood. It was named for Milton Tootle, a landowner.

In 1887, Atchison, Topeka and Santa Fe Railway built a branch line from Neva (3 miles west of Strong City) through TBD to Superior, Nebraska.  In 1996, the Atchison, Topeka and Santa Fe Railway merged with Burlington Northern Railroad and renamed to the current BNSF Railway.  Most locals still refer to this railroad as the "Santa Fe".

From 1909 to 1972, it was the home of Miltonvale Wesleyan College.

Geography
Miltonvale is located at  (39.348587, -97.453211).

Climate
The climate in this area is characterized by hot, humid summers and generally mild to cool winters.  According to the Köppen Climate Classification system, Miltonvale has a humid subtropical climate, abbreviated "Cfa" on climate maps.

Demographics

2010 census
As of the census of 2010, there were 539 people, 219 households, and 136 families living in the city. The racial makeup of the city was 97.6% White, 0.2% Native American, 0.2% Asian, 0.6% from other races, and 1.5% from two or more races. Hispanic or Latino of any race were 1.7% of the population.

There were 219 households, of which 35.2% had children under the age of 18 living with them, 49.8% were married couples living together, 6.8% had a female householder with no husband present, 5.5% had a male householder with no wife present, and 37.9% were non-families. 34.7% of all households were made up of individuals, and 20.1% had someone living alone who was 65 years of age or older. The average household size was 2.46 and the average family size was 3.16.

The median age in the city was 36.8 years. 29.7% of residents were under the age of 18; 5.9% were between the ages of 18 and 24; 21.6% were from 25 to 44; 23.1% were from 45 to 64; and 19.9% were 65 years of age or older. The gender makeup of the city was 49.5% male and 50.5% female.

2000 census
As of the census of 2000, there were 523 people, 223 households, and 130 families living in the city. The racial makeup of the city was 98.47% White, 0.19% African American, and 1.34% from two or more races. Hispanic or Latino of any race were 1.15% of the population.

There were 223 households, out of which 28.3% had children under the age of 18 living with them, 47.5% were married couples living together, 7.6% had a female householder with no husband present, and 41.3% were non-families. 39.5% of all households were made up of individuals, and 23.8% had someone living alone who was 65 years of age or older. The average household size was 2.27 and the average family size was 3.05.

In the city, the population was spread out, with 27.3% under the age of 18, 6.1% from 18 to 24, 20.3% from 25 to 44, 20.3% from 45 to 64, and 26.0% who were 65 years of age or older. The median age was 42 years. For every 100 females, there were 95.9 males. For every 100 females age 18 and over, there were 89.1 males.

The median income for a household in the city was $24,828, and the median income for a family was $32,750. Males had a median income of $24,500 versus $14,500 for females. The per capita income for the city was $14,710. About 6.1% of families and 11.1% of the population were below the poverty line, including 12.3% of those under age 18 and 9.5% of those age 65 or over.

Education
The community is served by Southern Cloud USD 334 public school district.

The Miltonvale Pirates won the Kansas State High School class 1A volleyball championship in 1978.

Former home to Miltonvale Wesleyan College from 1909 to 1972.

Notable people
 Jim Garlow, evangelical pastor
 Nellie Ross, first woman governor in the United States (Wyoming)
 Patrice Wymore, vaudeville and film actress, 3rd wife of Errol Flynn

References

Further reading

External links
 City of Miltonvale
 Miltonvale - Directory of Public Officials
 Miltonvale city map, KDOT

Cities in Kansas
Cities in Cloud County, Kansas
Populated places established in 1881
1881 establishments in Kansas